Guido de Baysio (born about the middle of the thirteenth century of a noble Ghibelline family; died at Avignon, 10 August 1313) was an Italian canonist.

The probable place of his birth is Reggio, where he also studied law under Guido de Suzaria. Here he became, successively, doctor and professor of canon law and also obtained an ecclesiastical benefice as canon. Gerhard, Bishop of Parma (d. 1301) attached Guido to himself; and remained his patron also as Cardinal-Archbishop of Sabina. To this patron Baysio dedicated his chief work, a commentary on the Decretum of Gratian, which he wrote about the year 1300 and entitled Rosarium Decretorum. It is a collection of older glossaries, not contained in the Glossa Ordinaria, and principally compiled from Huguccio. Many additions to the glossary which are found in the editions, published since 1505 (Paris), are taken from the Rosarium of Baysio and appear over his name.

In 1296 Pope Boniface VIII appointed Baysio Archdeacon of Bologna, and chancellor of the University of Bologna. Here he at first taught canon law privately and later on became a public professor, a position he held for three years.

Called to Avignon in 1304 he retained the dignity of archdeacon, held the office of papal chaplain, and also served in the Apostolic chancery until his death.

Works

During the brief pontificate of Pope Benedict XI (1303–1304) he wrote an accurate and complete, but rather diffuse, commentary on the "Liber sextus". His stay at Avignon was marked by a Tractatus super haeresi et aliis criminibus in causa Templariorum et D. Bonifacii. This latter work was written in connection with the condemnation of the Templars at the Council of Vienne. The second part of the work constitutes a defence of the orthodoxy of Boniface VIII. Having held the position of archdeacon, Baysio is often known by the name Archidiaconus and thus quoted. His chief work, the Rosarium, has gone through many editions.

References

Schulte, Geschichte der Quellen u. Litteratur des kan. Rechts (Stuttgart, 1875), II, 186–190
Hugo von Hurter, Nomenclator (Innsbruck, 1899), IV, 413
Scherer in Kirchenlex., II, s. v.

External links

Citations of Guido on ordination of women from womenpriests.org
"Rosarium decretorum" digital copy from Olomouc Research Library collection

14th-century Italian jurists
Canon law jurists
13th-century births
1313 deaths
13th-century Italian jurists
14th-century Latin writers